Gompers v. Buck's Stove and Range Co., 221 U.S. 418 (1911), was a ruling by the United States Supreme Court involving a case of contempt for violating the terms of an injunction restraining labor union leaders from a boycott or from publishing any statement that there was or had been a boycott.

Facts
In 1907 the metal polishers in the Buck Stove and Range Company in St. Louis, Missouri, struck for a nine-hour day. After the American Federation of Labor put the company on its "unfair list," the company obtained a sweeping injunction forbidding this boycott. For their refusal to obey, Samuel Gompers, John Mitchell and Frank Morrison were sentenced to prison for contempt.

Judgment
The Supreme Court dismissed the case, in part, as moot. Buck's Stove president James Van Cleave had died in 1910 and his successor resolved his dispute with the workers. The court also reversed the contempt decision on the grounds that the proceedings should have been instituted by the court rather than the plaintiff (the Buck's Stove company).

In the second contempt trial held in 1912, the defendants were again found guilty and sentenced to prison. The Supreme Court overturned the convictions in Gompers v. United States, because the proceedings had not been instituted within the three-year statute of limitations imposed by the Clayton Antitrust Act.

See also
History of labor law in the United States
List of United States Supreme Court cases, volume 221

Notes

References
Adams, James Truslow. Dictionary of American History. New York: Charles Scribner's Sons, 1940.
Foner, Philip S. History of the Labor Movement in the United States. Vol. 5: The AFL in the Progressive Era, 1910-1915. New York: International Publishers, 1980. Cloth ; Paperback 
Rayback, Joseph G. A History of American Labor. Rev. and exp. ed. New York: Macmillan Publishing Co., 1974.

External links

 

1911 in United States case law
United States labor case law
United States Supreme Court cases
United States Supreme Court cases of the White Court
American Federation of Labor
Consumer boycotts